Essilfuah Nana-Boison is a Ghanaian Banker and head of marketing and corporate affairs for Barclays Bank Ghana.

References

Ghanaian bankers